Tachina brevipalpis is a species of fly in the genus Tachina of the family Tachinidae that is endemic to Flores.

References

Insects described in 1953
Diptera of Asia
Flores Island (Indonesia)
brevipalpis